T. D. Evans was Mayor of Tulsa, Oklahoma from 1920 to 1922, including the period of the Tulsa race massacre on May 31 and June 1, 1921. He had previously been the judge ruling in the Tulsa Outrage trial of November 7, 1917.

References

Mayors of Tulsa, Oklahoma
Year of birth missing
Year of death missing
20th-century American politicians
20th-century American judges
Oklahoma Republicans